Santa Fe Trail-Kearny County Segment 1 is a historic site in Kearny County, Kansas which preserves a segment of the historic Santa Fe Trail.  It is also known as Charlie's Ruts or Bentrup's Ruts.

The approximately  area includes 12 swales.

References

External links

Roads on the National Register of Historic Places in Kansas
Kearny County, Kansas
Santa Fe Trail